The 1980 United States presidential election in Washington was held on November 4, 1980 as part of the 1980 United States presidential election. State voters chose nine representatives, or electors, to the Electoral College, who voted for president and vice president. 

Republican candidate Ronald Reagan won the state of Washington with 49.66 percent of the vote. During the previous election in 1976, Reagan, who was not on the ballot in any of the fifty states, received one of Washington's electoral votes by faithless elector Mike Padden.

Reagan won every county in the state except Gray's Harbor and Pacific Counties, neither of which ever voted Republican between 1956 and 2012. , Reagan's 1980 effort remains the last Republican win in Jefferson County and was the last in Cowlitz County until 2016. Third-party candidate John B. Anderson did well in Western Washington, gaining many voters from disaffected major-party supporters and exceeding 14 percent of the vote in Kitsap and San Juan Counties. Anderson was less successful east of the Cascades, apart from college-influenced Whitman County.

Results

Results by county

See also
 United States presidential elections in Washington (state)
 Presidency of Ronald Reagan

References

Washington
Washington
1980